Pilea depressa, the depressed clearweed, also sold as kiereweed,  is a plant native to the Caribbean.

References

depressa